Toua Udia (born ) is a Papua New Guinean male weightlifter, competing in the 77 kg category and representing Papua New Guinea at international competitions. He won the bronze medal at the 2011 Pacific Games, the gold medal at the 2013 Pacific Mini Games and the gold medal at the 2015 Pacific Games, lifting a total of 302 kg. He participated at the 2014 Commonwealth Games in the 77 kg event. Shortly after competing, Udia was acquitted in a case of sexual assault.

Major competitions

References

External links

1992 births
Living people
Papua New Guinean male weightlifters
Place of birth missing (living people)
Weightlifters at the 2014 Commonwealth Games
Commonwealth Games competitors for Papua New Guinea